Justice Abhay Mahadeo Thipsay (born 10 March 1955, in Bombay) was a Judge at the Bombay High Court and the Allahabad High Court. He is the brother of the chess player Praveen Thipsay. Among the cases he judged in his career were the Best Bakery case and the Sohrabuddin encounter case. His media statements around these cases were controversial, too.

Political career 
In 2018, Justice Abhay Thipsay, after his retirement, joined the Congress party.

Controversies
Testification for Nirav Modi
In May 2020, Thipsay was consulted by the lawyers of Nirav Modi, who was contesting his extradition to India at a hearing in Westminster Magistrates Court in London, via video link from India. Thipsay testified that the charges brought in by the CBI against Nirav Modi — which include criminal conspiracy, cheating and dishonestly inducting delivery of property — would not stand up under Indian law.

The Bharatiya Janata Party accused Thipsay of saving Nirav Modi on behest of the Congress

References 

1955 births
Living people
Marathi people
Judges of the Bombay High Court